Paul Bodmer (1886–1983) was a Swiss painter.

References

This article was initially translated from the German Wikipedia.

20th-century Swiss painters
20th-century Swiss male artists
Swiss male painters
1886 births
1983 deaths